Sierra Club Books was the publishing division, for both adults and children, of the Sierra Club, founded in  by then club President David Brower. They were a United States publishing company located in San Francisco, California with a concentration on biological conservation. In  the adult division of the organization was sold to Counterpoint LLC and the children's books division to Gibbs Smith.

History
In , they published the first of its climbers’ and hikers’ guides. In , when the Sierra Club Books began, they published the ‘Exhibit Format Book Series’, a collection of nature photography and in  they published their first color volume, Elliot Porter's In Wilderness Is the Preservation of the World.

In addition, books under their name had been published before , but done through already established publishers, as was the case with This Is Dinosaur, published by Alfred A. Knopf.

In , they introduced color photography to the series with the publication of In Wildness Is the Preservation of the World with photographs by Eliot Porter and Island In Time: The Point Reyes Peninsula with photographs by Philip Hyde. The series won the  Carey–Thomas Award for creative publishing, by Publishers Weekly. Fifty thousand copies were sold in the first four years, and by  sales exceeded . The books were successful in introducing the public to wilderness preservation and to the Sierra Club. Paperback reprints of many of the Exhibit Format books were published by Ballantine Books.

During Beckmann's tenure the program expanded and diversified considerably, publishing books by established and emerging writers such as Wendell Berry, Robert Bly, Galen Rowell, and David Rains Wallace as well as field guides, fiction, poetry, and books on environmental activism, such as the Sierra Club Battlebooks. Many Sierra Club books were produced by the Yolla Bolly Press run by Jim and Carolyn Robertson in Covelo, California. The program continued for two decades after , first under Peter Beren, the former marketing director, then under Helen Sweetland, the former children's books editor.

The Club continues to publish the Sierra Club Wilderness Calendar and the Sierra Club Engagement Calendar annually, which are perennial bestsellers. They are distributed to the book trade by Publishers Group West.

Partial bibliography

Exhibit Format

 This is the American Earth, Ansel Adams and Nancy Newhall
 Words of the Earth, photographs by Cedric Wright
 Time and the River Flowing: Grand Canyon, Philip Hyde and Franćois Leydet
 These We Inherit: The Parklands of America, Ansel Adams
 In Wildness Is the Preservation of the World, Henry David Thoreau
 The Place No One Knew: Glen Canyon on the Colorado, Eliot Porter
 Ansel Adams: A Biography, Volume 1: The Eloquent Light, Nancy Newhall
 The Last Redwoods: Photographs and Story of a Vanishing Scenic Resource, Philip Hyde and Franćois Leydet
 Gentle Wilderness: The Sierra Nevada, John Muir and Richard Kauffman
 Not Man Apart: Photographs of the Big Sur Coast, Robinson Jeffers
 The Wild Cascades: Forgotten Parkland, Harvey Manning
 Everest: The West Ridge, Thomas F. Hornbein
 Summer Island: Penobscot Country, Eliot Porter
 Glacier Bay: The Land and the Silence, Dave Bohn
 Navajo Wildlands: As Long as The Rivers Shall Run, Stephen Jett
 Kauai and the Park Country of Hawaii, Robert Wenkam
 Baja California and the Geography of Hope, Joseph Wood Krutch
 Central Park Country: A Tune Within Us, Mireille Johnston
 Galápagos: The Flow of Wildness - Vol. 1: Discovery, Eliot Porter
 Galápagos: The Flow of Wildness - Vol. 2: Prospect, Eliot Porter

Battlebooks
 Oil on Ice: Alaskan Wilderness at the Crossroads, Tom Brown
 Mercury: How Much Are We Eating?, Katherine and Peter Montague

Yolla Bolly Press
 The Wilder Shore, David Rains Wallace
 The Yosemite, John Muir

Material World
 Material World: A Global Family Portrait, Charles C. Mann
 Women in the Material World, Faith D'Aluisio

Other
 Island in Time: The Point Reyes Peninsula, Philip Hyde (photographer)
 On the Loose, Terry and Renny Russell
 The Population Bomb, Paul R. Ehrlich
 On the Shore of the Sundown Sea, T.H. Watkins
 Starr's Guide to the John Muir Trail and the High Sierra Region, Walter A. Starr, Jr.
 The Unsettling of America: Culture and Agriculture, Wendell Berry
 Nature's Economy: A History of Ecological Ideas, Donald Worster
 The Dark Range: A Naturalist's Night Notebook, David Rains Wallace
 Fifty Classic Climbs of North America, Steve Roper and Allen Steck
 Annapurna: A Woman's Place, Arlene Blum
 The Klamath Knot: Explorations in Myth and Evolution, David Rains Wallace
 In a Grain of Sand: Exploring Design by Nature, Andreas Feininger
 Wild by Law: The Sierra Club Legal Defense Fund and the Places It Has Saved, Tom Turner
 California's Wild Heritage: Threatened and Endangered Animals in the Golden State, Peter Steinhart
 In the Absence of the Sacred: The Failure of Technology and the Survival of the Indian Nations, Jerry Mander
 Mother Earth: Through the Eyes of Women Photographers and Writers, Judith Boice, editor
 Ecopsychology: Restoring the Earth, Healing the Mind, Theodore Roszak, Allen D. Kanner and Mary E. Gomes
 The Monkey's Bridge: Mysteries of Evolution in Central America, David Rains Wallace
 Bay Area Wild: A Celebration of the Natural Heritage of the San Francisco Bay Area, Galen Rowell and  Michael Sewell
 The Winemaker's Marsh: Four Seasons in a Restored Wetland, Kenneth Brower
 Galen Rowell: A Retrospective, Andy Grundberg
  Gloryland: A Novel, Shelton Johnson

References

Sierra Club
Organizations based in San Francisco
Book publishing companies based in San Francisco
Environmental non-fiction books
Environmental publishers
Publishing companies established in 1960